During the 1996–97 German football season, Borussia Dortmund competed in the German Bundesliga.

Season summary
Dortmund failed to win a third straight Bundesliga title and finished the season in third, eight points off champions Bayern Munich, but made up for the league disappointment by winning the Champions League for the first time in their history, defeating a Juventus side featuring the likes of Zinedine Zidane, Didier Deschamps and Christian Vieri at the Olympiastadion in Munich.

Squad
Squad at end of season

Left club during season

Competitions

Bundesliga

Dortmund came in 3rd in the Bundesliga.

League table

DFB-Pokal

DFB-Supercup

UEFA Champions League

Dortmund won the UEFA Champions League.

Group stage

Knockout stage

Quarter-finals

Semi-finals

Final

Kits

References

Borussia Dortmund seasons
Borussia Dortmund
UEFA Champions League-winning seasons